Anthony Lucero (born November 1, 1967 in Los Angeles, California) is an American poet. He is also known for his work as an actor and more recently as a film director for the Georgia-themed film Halo of Stars. Lucero is also a citizen of Georgia since 2016.

Writing 

A small press, Chiron Review published Lucero's "The Living Party" in 1991 and he was subsequently published in the small press world over the next decade. Editor and archivist Geof Huth has called his work "Incomparable."  He published an acclaimed poem, The Clown which was widely reviewed and became the basis of his film Halo of Stars.

Lucero has written an adaptation of Richard Brautigan's, A Confederate General from Big Sur, for Benicio Del Toro.

Acting 

A guest starring role on NBC's Unsub in 1989 was followed by performances in such films as HBO's The Image, Pump Up the Volume (Golden Space Needle Award at the Seattle FF, Audience Award at the Deauville FF), Silent Rain (Academy Award winning short) and Molder of Dreams.

Lucero had a role in the 1997 independent film Loved, which starred William Hurt and Robin Wright.

Directing 

Since 2010, Lucero has been directing a documentary on Richard Brautigan. He has also been directing a longer reaching documentary, Tomás the Red Haired Angel, about a Czech clown. Both documentaries are expected to be complete by 2028.

Circus Remedy

In 2006 Lucero co-founded the circus outreach organization, Circus Remedy.

Filmography

References

External links 

 
 www.circusremedy.org

Living people
1967 births
Male actors from California
American film producers
American film directors